William Shaw Andrew MC  (6 February 1884 – 19 July 1963) was an Anglican priest in the mid 20th Century.

He was born on 6 February 1884 and educated at Sheffield Grammar School and Wadham College, Oxford.  Ordained in 1909, he held  curacies at St Luke the Evangelist, Walton-on-the-Hill and St Michael, Beccles. He was a Temporary Chaplain to the Forces during World War I. Later he held incumbencies at Boxford and St Andrews.  before becoming Dean of  St Andrews, Dunkeld and Dunblane.

He died on 19 July 1963.

References

1884 births
People educated at Sheffield Grammar School
Alumni of Wadham College, Oxford
Recipients of the Military Cross
Deans of St Andrews, Dunkeld and Dunblane
1963 deaths
Scottish military chaplains
World War I chaplains